Kim Seung-woo (born 25 March 1998) is a South Korean footballer currently playing as a defender for Gwangju FC.

Career statistics

Club

References

1998 births
Living people
South Korean footballers
South Korea youth international footballers
Association football defenders
K League 1 players
K League 2 players
Jeju United FC players
Gwangju FC players